Aberdeen F.C. competed in the Scottish Football League and Scottish Cup in season 1919–20.

Overview

Aberdeen returned to league football in 1919 after a two-year absence due to the First World War. They were placed in an expanded Division One, where they finished 17th out of 22 clubs. In the Scottish Cup, they were knocked out in the fourth round by Albion Rovers. A new attendance record was set at Pittodrie when 25,000 fans attended a game against Celtic in November 1919.

Results

Scottish Football League

Final standings

Scottish Cup

Squad

Appearances & Goals

|}

References

Aberdeen F.C. seasons
Aberdeen